Anthony Khelifa (born 20 September 2005) is a French professional footballer who plays as a centre-back for Ajaccio.

Career
A youth product of Gazélec Ajaccio, and moved over to Ajaccio's youth academy at the age of 10. He worked his way up Ajaccio's youth teams, captaining their U19s and debuting with their reserves in 2022. He started training with Ajaccio's senior team in January 2023. He made his professional debut with Ajaccio as a late substitute in a 3–0 Ligue 1 loss to Nice on 10 February 2023.

Personal life
Born in France, Khelifa is of Algerian and French descent.

Playing style
Khelifa played forward as a youth, but switched to centre-back. He is a complete defender who is strong, fast and good aerially.

References

External links
 
 

2005 births
Living people
Sportspeople from Marseille
French footballers
French sportspeople of Algerian descent
AC Ajaccio players
Ligue 1 players
Championnat National 3 players
Association football forwards